Abdelmajid Bourebbou (born March 16, 1951, in Arris, Batna) is a former Algerian footballer. He played as a striker for several French clubs as well as the Algeria national football team. He represented Algeria at the 1982 FIFA World Cup in Spain.

External links
 Weltfussball
 Profile

Living people
1951 births
People from Batna Province
Algerian footballers
Association football forwards
Algeria international footballers
FC Rouen players
Stade Lavallois players
Ligue 1 players
Ligue 2 players
1982 FIFA World Cup players
Algerian expatriate footballers
US Quevilly-Rouen Métropole players
Expatriate footballers in France
Algerian expatriate sportspeople in France
21st-century Algerian people